is a railway station in Tomakomai, Hokkaido, Japan, operated by the Hokkaido Railway Company (JR Hokkaido).

Lines
Tomakomai Station is served by the following lines.
 Muroran Main Line
 Chitose Line
 Hidaka Main Line

Limited express trains
 Hokuto ( - )
 Suzuran ( - )

The Following Services have Discontinued
 Cassiopeia ( - ) 
 Hokutosei ( - )

Station layout
 Above-ground station with two platforms serving four tracks.

History
The station opened on 1 August 1892.

References

External links
 JR Hokkaido station information 

Railway stations in Hokkaido Prefecture
Railway stations in Japan opened in 1892